Alan or Allan Barry may refer to:

Allan Barry, American football player
Alan Barry, musician in Fields (progressive rock band)
Alan Barry is an Italo disco alias-act of an Italian band that was produced by The Saifam Group.

See also
Barry Allen (disambiguation)